The Portland Trail Blazers are a professional basketball team in the Western Conference of the National Basketball Association. The Trail Blazers are currently celebrating their 50th NBA season.  The franchise owner is Jody Allen, who assumed ownership upon the death of her brother Microsoft co-founder and Vulcan Inc. chairman Paul Allen, in 2018.

The Trail Blazers' rallying cry is "Rip City", coined by play-by-play announcer Bill Schonely during their inaugural season. The team holds the NBA record for most consecutive sell-out games – set between April 9, 1977, and November 16, 1995.

The Trail Blazers have retired several players jerseys, including Naismith Memorial Basketball Hall of Fame members Clyde Drexler and Bill Walton. Jack Ramsay, who was the Trail Blazers head coach from 1976 to 1986, had the number 77 retired in honor of Portland's only NBA Finals victory in 1977. Portland has had four NBA Rookies of the Year; Geoff Petrie (1971), Sidney Wicks (1972), Brandon Roy (2007) and Damian Lillard (2013). The only NBA Most Valuable Player that earned the award as a member of the Trail Blazers was Bill Walton in 1978.

Background and franchise opening

Harry Glickman got interested in creating an NBA team in his hometown of Portland, Oregon as soon as the Memorial Coliseum was opened in 1960. The league commissioner at the time, Maurice Podoloff, refused on the grounds that Oregon was too far. Given that in the 1960s new commissioner J. Walter Kennedy expanded the league into the West, on February 6, 1970, the NBA board of governors granted Portland – along with Buffalo and Cleveland – the rights to a franchise in return for a $3.7 million admission. Glickman got the money from real estate magnates Robert Schmertz of New Jersey, Larry Weinberg of Los Angeles and Herman Sarkowsky of Seattle – who was recommended by Dick Vertlieb, then general manager of the Seattle SuperSonics.

1970–74: Early franchise history

The Blazers started play in the 1970–71 NBA season, along with the Buffalo Braves (now the Los Angeles Clippers) and the Cleveland Cavaliers. The team was led by coach Rolland Todd, brought from the University of Nevada, and was based around Geoff Petrie, a first-round choice in the 1970 NBA draft out of Princeton University, and LeRoy Ellis, whom they acquired in the 1970 NBA Expansion Draft. In their first season, the Blazers finished with a 29–53 record, which was the best of the three new teams in the NBA. Petrie was named co-Rookie of the Year after averaging 24.8 points per game.

The next season, the Blazers won only 18 games, but rookie Sidney Wicks was named Rookie of the Year after averaging 24.5 points per game and 11.5 rebounds per game. The following year, the team used the first pick in the NBA Draft on LaRue Martin and the Trail Blazers finished at 21–61.

1974–79: Bill Walton era
The Blazers did not beat their first season's record until they drafted Bill Walton from UCLA in 1974. In the first two years, under coach Lenny Wilkens, the Blazers improved, but still did not post a winning record (nor did they make the playoffs). In the 1976 off-season, Wilkens was fired and replaced with Jack Ramsay. In that off-season, four-time All-Star Sidney Wicks was sent to Boston and the team acquired forward Maurice Lucas in the dispersal draft that occurred when the American Basketball Association was acquired by the NBA.

1977 championship

In the 1976–77 campaign, the Blazers posted their first winning record, going 49–33 under the leadership of Ramsay.  Bill Walton led the NBA in both rebounding and blocked shots, and was named to the All-Defensive first team.  The team—Walton at center, Lucas and Bob Gross at forward, and Dave Twardzik and Lionel Hollins at guard—made the playoffs for the first time.  The Blazers won the NBA championship in their first time in the playoffs.  After defeating the Chicago Bulls (who were a Western Conference team at the time) and the Denver Nuggets (a surviving ABA team) in the early rounds, the Blazers defeated the favored Los Angeles Lakers, led by Kareem Abdul-Jabbar, in four straight games.  They then went on to defeat the Philadelphia 76ers 4–2 for the championship.  Following his dominating performance, Walton was named MVP of the NBA finals.

The team started the 1977–78 season with a 50–10 mark, and many predicted a dynasty in Portland.  Walton was named the league's regular season MVP and both he and Maurice Lucas were named to the NBA All-Defensive first team.  A rash of injuries set in, however, most notably an injury to Bill Walton's foot that ended his season and would plague him over the remainder of his career. The team struggled to an 8–14 finish, and lost to the Seattle SuperSonics in the 1978 conference semifinals. That summer, Walton demanded to be traded to a team of his choice (Clippers, Knicks, Warriors, or 76ers) because he was unhappy with his medical treatment in Portland. Walton was never traded, and he held out the entire 1978–79 season and left the team as a free agent thereafter.  Maurice Lucas left the team in 1980, and the Blazers "dynasty" was finished.

The early 1980s

Despite the loss of several key players due to injury (most notably Walton, who left the team in 1979), the team continued to play competitive basketball. The sellout streak continued. The team continued to make the playoffs every year except for one (1981–1982), and on several occasions advanced past the first round. However, the NBA's Western Conference at that time was dominated by the L.A. Lakers (with a few Finals appearances by the Houston Rockets).

In the 1978 draft, the Blazers (for the third time in their history) landed the #1 pick in the draft; and selected Mychal Thompson, a center originally from the Bahamas. Over the next several years; the team acquired several other players who many thought could form the nucleus of a championship contender—Jim Paxson, T. R. Dunn, Fat Lever, and Wayne Cooper.

1983–94: Clyde Drexler era
In 1983, the team selected Clyde Drexler, who would go on to a Hall of Fame career (eventually winning an NBA title with Houston).

Looking for help at center, the Blazers used the #2 pick in the 1984 draft to draft center Sam Bowie.  Although Bowie had missed two full collegiate seasons due to leg injuries, the Blazers took him while Michael Jordan, Charles Barkley and John Stockton were all still on the board. Bowie suffered a series of leg injuries that limited his production for the team; he even missed the entire 1987–88 season due to injuries.  Bowie is now considered one of the biggest draft busts in NBA history.  The Blazers had far better luck with their second-round pick, Jerome Kersey, who would be one of the anchors of the franchise for a decade. That summer, the team sent Dunn, Lever, Cooper, Calvin Natt and two draft picks to the Denver Nuggets for forward Kiki Vandeweghe.

In 1985, the team selected point guard Terry Porter in the draft.

After several consecutive seasons of losing in the first round, the Ramsay Era ended in the summer of 1986 when the long-time coach was fired and replaced with Mike Schuler.

Summer of 1986

In the first round of the draft, the Blazers (who had two picks) selected forward Walter Berry out of St. John's and center Arvydas Sabonis out of the Soviet Union.  Later in the draft, the team reached behind the Iron Curtain again, and chose guard Dražen Petrović from what was then Yugoslavia. Drafting two players from the Eastern Bloc was highly controversial—the Cold War was still going on, and many doubted that either player would be permitted to come play in the NBA. (The selection of Sabonis would become even more controversial in 1988, when the Lithuanian center was allowed to come to Portland to train, and then led the Soviet Union to a gold medal in the 1988 Summer Olympics in Seoul.)

After only a few months with the team, Berry was traded to the San Antonio Spurs for another rookie, center Kevin Duckworth.

1986–88: Mike Schuler era
Mike Schuler was hired prior to the start of the 1986–87 season as head coach of the Blazers. In his first two campaigns, the Schuler-led Blazers posted records of 49–33 (in 1986–87) and 53–29 (in 1987–88).  Both teams made the playoffs (with home court advantage) but were defeated in the first round (to Houston in 1987, and to the Utah Jazz in 1988).  In both years, the Blazers were among league leaders in scoring, but near the bottom of league rankings in defense and rebounding statistics.

The Schuler era was marked by several controversies regarding the starting lineup. The first such controversy occurred when Clyde Drexler won the starting guard spot over veteran Jim Paxson, who subsequently demanded (and got) a trade; eventually traded to Boston for Jerry Sichting. In the 1987–88 campaign, veteran center Steve Johnson was injured, and was replaced in the lineup by Duckworth, who went on to win the starting job from the foul-prone Johnson. As the team was winning, these controversies were glossed over at first.

1988–89: The season of change

At the conclusion of the 1987–88 campaign, the team was purchased by current owner Paul Allen, the co-founder of Microsoft for $70 million from Larry Weinberg. The sale made Allen, then 35, the youngest team owner in all of the Big Four professional sports. The team quickly fell apart during the year, as the issue of who should start became paramount. In addition, many veterans were unhappy with Mike Schuler's coaching style; as a result the team limped to a 39–43 record and barely made the playoffs (where it was ousted by the Lakers 3–0 in the first round). Schuler was fired; assistant Rick Adelman was given the head coaching job on an interim basis.

That summer, Sam Bowie and a draft pick were traded to the New Jersey Nets for veteran forward Buck Williams, a respectable defensive and rebounding power forward. Vandeweghe was sent to the New York Knicks for a draft pick, and Johnson was taken by the expansion Minnesota Timberwolves in the expansion draft. Dražen Petrović was permitted by the Yugoslav authorities to come to Portland and join the team. For the second round of the draft, Portland selected a young forward from UConn, Clifford Robinson.

1989–92: Return to the finals

With the exception of the championship year of 1976–77 (and the following season), the early 1990s is generally regarded as the greatest era in team history.  In the 1989–90 campaign, the team posted a 59–23 record, and defeated the Dallas Mavericks, San Antonio Spurs, and Phoenix Suns in the Western Conference playoffs. The team was ultimately defeated by the defending-champion Detroit Pistons, led by Bill Laimbeer and Isiah Thomas, 4–1.

That off-season, Petrović joined the New Jersey Nets, where he would perform at an All-Star level before his death in an auto accident in 1993. To replace him, the team signed free agent guard Danny Ainge, who had won three titles with the Boston Celtics in the 1980s. In the 1990–91 season, the Blazers posted a 63–19 record—the best in the league and the best in franchise history. They ended the Lakers' nine-year reign over the Pacific Division and won home-court advantage throughout the playoffs. The season ended when the Lakers defeated the Blazers 4–2 in the Western Conference finals.

In the 1991–92 campaign, the Blazers repeated as Pacific champions.  They steamrolled through the Western Conference playoffs en route to a showdown with the Chicago Bulls in the Finals—one that they lost 4–2, and which cemented the reputations of both Jordan and Drexler (placing the latter firmly in the former's shadow).

1992–94: End of the Adelman era

After the 1991–92 campaign, Ainge left for Phoenix and became a major player in the Suns' run to the finals in the following season. To replace him in the backcourt, the Trail Blazers signed free agent guard Rod Strickland, who was a rather controversial player.

A series of injuries and other issues started to plague the team. Kevin Duckworth's performance dropped off significantly. Drexler, Kersey, and Buck Williams also started showing signs of age; Drexler and Kersey missed a combined 50 games due to injury. Despite this, the team posted a 51–31 record. A bright spot was the continuing emergence of Clifford Robinson; "Uncle Cliffy" was awarded the Sixth Man Award.

The team failed to advance in the playoffs, losing to David Robinson and the San Antonio Spurs in the first round.

Two other events occurred in the team in the 1992–93 season.  Owner Paul Allen started breaking ground on the Rose Garden, which would replace the Memorial Coliseum, which was the Blazers' home court at the time.

On a far more negative note was the infamous "Blazer Sex Scandal." While on a road trip to Utah, several members of the team were charged by a Utah prosecutor with statutory rape. Eventually, four players, including Jerome Kersey, received suspensions from the team; the criminal charges were dropped due to lack of evidence.

In the 1993–94 campaign, Terry Porter suffered an injury and was replaced in the starting lineup with Strickland. Duckworth was traded in the off-season to the Washington Bullets for forward Harvey Grant. To replace Duckworth, center Chris Dudley was signed to a one-year contract (a deal which incurred the wrath of NBA commissioner David Stern who viewed it as an attempt to circumvent the league's salary cap—the Blazers prevailed in arbitration over the matter). Portland went 49-33 and was eliminated by eventual champion Houston in the first round.  Adelman was fired and replaced with Seton Hall coach P. J. Carlesimo.

1994–96: Bob Whitsitt era 
The 1994–95 season was also the first in the reign of "Trader" Bob Whitsitt. At the time, Whitsitt was viewed (throughout the NBA) as one of the brightest executives in the league . He was a master of the salary cap (and other details of the collective bargaining agreement  between the NBA and its players) and was widely viewed as the prime architect of the Seattle SuperSonics.  After a falling-out with Sonics' owner Barry Ackerley, Whitsitt was hired by Paul Allen and set about rebuilding the team.

The 1994–95 campaign was the last for a key member of the Blazers' squad for the previous 11 years: Drexler was traded in the middle of the season to the Houston Rockets for Otis Thorpe and a draft pick (where he, along with center Hakeem Olajuwon would lead the Rockets to a second consecutive NBA title).  His number was retired in 2001, and he is widely regarded as one of the best Blazers ever along with Bill Walton. The 1994–95 campaign was also the last year in the Memorial Coliseum.

The Blazers that year were an above-average defensive team but a poor offensive one.  They posted a 44–38 record and were swept by Phoenix in the first round of the playoffs.

The next year (1995–96), the team moved into their new home, the Rose Garden.  The team was led in scoring by Robinson; that year also saw Lithuanian center Arvydas Sabonis join the Blazers nearly ten years after he was drafted by the team (he was originally drafted in 1986, but was barred by Soviet authorities from going to the United States).  Sabonis, although a shadow of his former self due to age and injury , was still a dominating force in the middle for the team.  However, the season also saw the rise of tensions between Carlesimo and Strickland; Strickland disliked Carlesimo's rather vocal and intense style .

The 1995–96 Blazers posted an identical 44–38 record that year, and were defeated by Utah 3–2 in the first round.  In game five against the Jazz, the Blazers were defeated 102–64, setting a record (since broken, ironically by the Jazz) for the fewest points scored in a playoff game. The season marked the last in Portland for forward Buck Williams, an important member of the team's two Finals runs.

1996–2000: Whitsitt makes his mark

The 1996 off-season was yet another eventful one for the Trail Blazers.  Strickland demanded a trade, and got one, being sent to Washington (along with Harvey Grant) for forward Rasheed Wallace. A second trade brought guard Isaiah Rider from Minnesota. To replace Strickland, the Blazers signed playground legend Kenny Anderson to a free-agent contract. In the draft that year, the team selected a high school player, Jermaine O'Neal. Initially, this approach worked, as the team returned to the Western Conference finals in 1999 under head coach Mike Dunleavy. After being swept by the eventual champion San Antonio Spurs, Whitsitt sent Rider and guard Jim Jackson to the Atlanta Hawks for guard Steve Smith and acquired former All-Star forward Scottie Pippen from the Houston Rockets. The team again advanced to the Western Conference Finals, where they faced a Los Angeles Lakers team led by Shaquille O'Neal and Kobe Bryant. In that series, the Trail Blazers dropped three out of the first four games before winning the next two, forcing a pivotal Game 7. The Blazers had a 15-point lead in the fourth quarter, but lost the game and the series to the Lakers, who went on to win the first of three consecutive titles.

To some, this represented the influx of young talent the Blazers, who had been a rather ordinary team in previous years, needed to return to the ranks of the league powers . To others, the moves represented a disturbing new trend of placing talent above character .

Rider got arrested two days prior to his debut game, and Wallace had a well-established reputation as a hothead. In addition, the drafting of high schooler O'Neal was a controversial move.  However, the moves worked initially, as the Blazers improved on their prior record, winning 49 games.  The playoff results were the same, however: a first round loss, this time to the Lakers. Carlesimo was fired and replaced with Mike Dunleavy.

One other long-time fixture with the Blazers left the team as well. Clifford Robinson, widely blamed for recent playoff failures  (in part due to a noticeable decline in his performance in the playoffs) was allowed to leave as a free agent during the 1997 off-season.

In addition to Dunleavy, the 1997–98 campaign saw two other important new faces: forward Brian Grant who was signed as a free agent in the off-season, and guard Damon Stoudamire, who was acquired in a mid-season trade with the Toronto Raptors for Anderson. In his first NBA seasons with Toronto, the Portland native won Rookie of the Year honors and posted All-Star quality numbers for the Raptors, and reminded many of a young Isiah Thomas.  Many expected that "Mighty Mouse" would become the franchise player the team had lacked since Drexler left.

In the abbreviated 1999 season, the Blazers advanced to their third conference final of the decade, only to be swept by the Spurs. The tone was punctuated in Game 2 of the series, when Spurs forward Sean Elliott hit a game-winning 3-pointer in what was referred to as the "Memorial Day Miracle." That off-season, the Blazers made one of the franchise's most notable acquisitions, making a blockbuster (six-for-one) trade for six-time NBA champion Pippen after Pippen's dysfunctional Houston Rockets stint. As mentioned above, Whitsitt brought in Smith while trading away Rider.

Led by Stoudamire, Smith, Pippen, Wallace, Sabonis and sixth man Grant, the 2000 Blazers finished with the second-best record in the league, behind only the Lakers.  They returned to the Western Conference finals, where they played against the Lakers. The Lakers, led on the floor by Kobe Bryant and Shaquille O'Neal and coached by Phil Jackson, split the first two games in Los Angeles with the Blazers. The Lakers then took two straight from the Blazers in Portland. The Blazers then came back to win Games 5 and 6. The Blazers were leading by 15 points in the fourth quarter of Game 7 at Los Angeles, before the Lakers came back and won the series in a 4th-quarter rally reminiscent of Game 6 against the Bulls almost ten years ago. The Lakers went on to win the first of three consecutive NBA titles with Shaq, Kobe, and Jackson at the helm.

The Jailblazers
That summer, Brian Grant was traded to the Miami Heat in a three-team deal that brought Shawn Kemp from the Cleveland Cavaliers.  The move reunited Whitsitt with the player that first allowed him to make a splash in NBA front-office circles.

A second problem perceived was the need to have more "big bodies" to defend against Shaquille O'Neal; as a result, forward/center Jermaine O'Neal was traded to the Indiana Pacers for Dale Davis. This trade is regarded as a disaster for the Blazers, as O'Neal became an 6-time All-Star while Davis had several serviceable years in Portland.  Third, Steve Smith requested and got a trade to San Antonio for guard Derek Anderson. Finally, the Blazers signed free agent forward Ruben Patterson.

With the new lineup, the team won 42 of their first 60 games. After Wells suffered a season-ending injury, however, the team was swept in four games by the Lakers.

2000–2003: The "Jail Blazers"
The Trail Blazers made a series of personnel moves in the 2000 and 2001 off-seasons that failed to produce the desired results. Forward Jermaine O'Neal was traded to the Indiana Pacers for Dale Davis. Brian Grant signed with the Miami Heat, and was replaced with ex-Seattle forward Shawn Kemp. The team started off well, posting the Western Conference's best record through March 2001, and then signed guard Rod Strickland to augment their point guard corps. The move backfired, and the team lost 14 of its remaining 22 games, and was eliminated in the first round of the playoffs (swept by the Los Angeles Lakers).  Some in the media began to criticize the team, and Whitsitt, previously proclaimed a genius for his work in both Seattle and Portland, was criticized.  A particular criticism was that Whitsitt was attempting to win a title by assembling a roster of stars, without paying attention to team chemistry. Longtime NBA coach and analyst, Doug Collins, referred to Whitsitt as a "rotisserie-league manager." A fan was ejected from the Rose Garden for holding up a banner that said "Trade Whitsitt," and many in the national media started referring to the team as the "Jail Blazers" because of many players' off-court problems.

That offseason the churning continued; Dunleavy was fired, and replaced with Maurice Cheeks, a "players' coach" who some thought would relate better to the players than Dunleavy did. More transactions followed as the Blazers traded Steve Smith to the Spurs for Derek Anderson. In one of his most controversial moves to that time, Whitsitt signed free agent Ruben Patterson, who had previously pleaded no contest to a felony sexual assault charge and was required to register as a sex offender. Popular center, Arvydas Sabonis, who had a towel flung in his face by Rasheed Wallace during the playoffs, decided to leave the team.

The next two seasons were just as disastrous for the team's reputation. Several players, including Wallace, Stoudamire, and Qyntel Woods, were cited for marijuana possession. Woods pleaded guilty to first-degree animal abuse for staging dog fights in his house, some involving his pit bull named Hollywood. Hollywood and Woods' other pit bull, Sugar, were confiscated, and Woods was given eighty hours of community service. He also agreed to donate $10,000 to the Oregon Humane Society. Wallace was suspended for seven games for threatening a referee. Zach Randolph and Patterson got in a fight during practice, with Randolph sucker punching his teammate in the eye, an injury which kept Patterson from making a meaningful contribution during the playoffs. When police came to Stoudamire's house to respond to a burglar alarm, they noticed the smell of marijuana, searched the premises, and found a pound of cannabis located in a crawlspace; the search was later declared illegal and charges in the matter were dropped. Guard Bonzi Wells famously told Sports Illustrated in a 2002 interview:

Fan discontent soared; despite the team continuing to post a winning record, attendance at the Rose Garden started to decline. In the summer of 2003, with attendance declining, the team going nowhere on the court, and an exorbitant payroll, Whitsitt announced that he would leave the team to focus on Paul Allen's other franchise, the Seattle Seahawks.

The Patterson/Nash era 
Patterson and general manager John Nash immediately began a campaign to clean up the team's image. A "25 point pledge" was announced and published, describing a standard of conduct that all Blazer personnel would be required to live up to. The Blazers' draft choice that year, the ironically named Travis Outlaw, was the son of a police officer and had a spotless record.

Not long after the 2003–04 season started, Bonzi Wells launched a tirade at Cheeks during practice ; he was suspended and soon traded to the Memphis Grizzlies for Wesley Person and a first round pick. Soon after that, Rasheed Wallace gave an extended interview in which he claimed that the NBA exploited African American players. This interview was widely denounced by the team, the media, and the league, but no official punishment resulted.

During the season, two other "character" trades occurred. Point guard Jeff McInnis, considered by many to be disruptive in the locker room , was sent to Cleveland with Ruben Boumtje-Boumtje for forward Darius Miles and cash. Wallace was sent to the Atlanta Hawks along with Person for forward Shareef Abdur-Rahim, center Theo Ratliff and Dan Dickau. Many of these trades were welcomed by the fan base, but they were disruptive to team chemistry: the Wallace trade occurred during a "hot streak", after the trade was commenced the hot streak abruptly ended. The team posted a 41–41 record and missed the playoffs for the first time since 1981.  The Blazers' 21 straight playoff appearances was the second longest in the NBA, behind the 76ers's 22 consecutive playoff appearances.

2004–2005
The team selected Sebastian Telfair, a high-school player from New York City, with its first draft pick. The team also selected two European players, Viktor Khryapa and Sergei Monia, with later picks, as well as Korean center Ha Seung-Jin in the second round. Three players—Darius Miles, Ratliff, and Zach Randolph—were given large contract extensions in the summer of 2004.  Dale Davis, who had grown increasingly disgruntled in Portland, was traded to the Golden State Warriors for also-disgruntled guard Nick Van Exel, and center Joel Przybilla was signed to a free agent contract.

When the season started, the Blazers stumbled out of the gate. The starting lineup consisted of Ratliff, Randolph, Abdur-Rahim, Stoudamire, and Anderson. For the early part of the season, the team played mostly a .500 record, but there were numerous complaints and chemistry issues. There were numerous line-up experiments over the course of the season, as Cheeks looked for a winning combination, but the team never won more than two games in a row the entire season. In addition, injuries took their toll—Anderson, Abdur-Rahim, and Randolph all logged significant minutes on the injured list. In addition, the bankruptcy of the Rose Garden became a major distraction. Television ratings also fell through.

The frustrations came to a boiling point when during a practice, Miles launched into an obscenity-laced tirade against his coach in full view of other players (as well as a few reporters). The tirade included various racial slurs (both Cheeks and Miles are African American), as well as the claim that Cheeks was a lame-duck coach and thus Miles had no reason to listen to him. The team reacted with a two-game suspension for Miles. A memo was leaked about a proposed settlement between Miles and the team, in which the team would agree to refund (to Miles) the pay forfeited as a result of the two-game suspension. Blazers management's position was that the memo was only a draft, and that this practice was business as usual in the NBA—the terms of the collective bargaining agreement made it difficult for teams to enforce fines against players without them being overturned by arbitrators. A subsequent investigation by The Wall Street Journal revealed that the practice of publicly punishing players and privately rescinding the punishment is indeed common in the league.

At any rate, Miles' prediction was accurate. On March 2, 2005, Cheeks was fired and replaced on an interim basis by director of player personnel Kevin Pritchard. More playing time was given to a cast of young players including Telfair, Travis Outlaw, Khryapa, Przybilla, and Ha. The team qualified for the lottery.

Financial difficulties
At the end of the 2003 season, after which Bob Whitsitt resigned, the team was public about its desire to cut costs. Several players viewed by many as "assets" were traded for not much in return, and/or allowed to depart via free agency with no attempt to re-sign them.  Oregon Arena Corp., the Blazers' sister company, declared bankruptcy in 2004. Because of the bankruptcy, owner Paul Allen lost control of the Rose Garden, which was turned over to the creditors.

In February 2006, team management went public with the claim that without the revenue from the Rose Garden, the Blazers have found it difficult to turn a profit.

NBA Commissioner David Stern stated, "My goal on behalf of the league would be to keep the team in Portland, playing in the Rose Garden, with economic prospects that make some financial sense." The Blazers are contractually obligated to play in the Rose Garden until 2023.  However, some believe a bankruptcy filing, were it to occur, and might eliminate any restrictions on the team's ability to relocate. Allen put the Blazers up for sale during the season, receiving several bids for the franchise, but took it off the market in August 2006.

2005–present 

In July 2005, the Blazers announced the hiring of Nate McMillan as their new head basketball coach, ending a several-month-long search.  Other candidates for the position included Marc Iavaroni, Terry Porter, and Lionel Hollins.

The Blazers won the #3 pick in the 2005 draft.  On draft day, however, the team traded the pick to the Utah Jazz for the #6 and #27 picks in the 2005 draft, and a conditional pick in the 2006 draft (belonging initially to the Detroit Pistons).  The Blazers used the #6 pick to draft Martell Webster.  The 27th pick was used to draft Linas Kleiza, and the 35th pick (the Blazers' own) was used to draft Ricky Sánchez. The 27th and 35th picks were traded on draft night for the Denver Nuggets #22 pick, Jarrett Jack.

2005–2006 season
Several controversies arose during the 2005–06 season. Sebastian Telfair, who replaced Damon Stoudamire as the starting point guard, had issues with McMillan. Forward Ruben Patterson engaged in several public power struggles with McMillan and earned a lengthy suspension from the team. Zach Randolph, recovering from a knee injury, was criticized for his alleged poor play and work ethic. Darius Miles also had issues with McMillan, including a game where he changed into street clothes at halftime in protest of lack of playing time.  Both Miles and Randolph publicly requested trades, though Randolph later apologized.  In May 2006, Miles gave an interview with The Oregonian reporter Jason Quick in which he admitted to coming to practice with alcohol on his breath. Telfair, Miles, Randolph, Theo Ratliff, and Joel Przybilla also spent significant minutes out with injuries. The Blazers finished the season 21–61, the worst in the NBA, and landed the fourth pick in the 2006 NBA draft.

2006–2012: LaMarcus Aldridge and Brandon Roy era

In the 2006 NBA draft the Blazers traded Viktor Khryapa and draft rights for Tyrus Thomas for draft rights to LaMarcus Aldridge.  The Blazers also traded for the sixth pick, Brandon Roy.

In the spring of 2007, Steve Patterson resigned as team president, and Paul Allen entered into an agreement to re-purchase the Rose Garden. On the court, the team finished with a 32–50 record, an 11-game improvement, and rookie shooting guard Roy was named the 2006–07 Rookie of the Year. That summer Pritchard was promoted to general manager, and former Nike Inc. executive Larry Miller was hired as team president. The Blazers won the 2007 NBA Draft Lottery and selected Ohio State center Greg Oden with the No. 1 pick in the draft. Some had speculated that they might choose Kevin Durant instead; Durant was picked at No. 2 by regional rivals the Seattle SuperSonics. Oden suffered a pre-season knee injury requiring microfracture surgery, and missed the entire 2007–08 season. Oden's constant battle with injuries and Durant's success resulted in comparisons to the Blazers' selection of Sam Bowie over Michael Jordan in 1984.

Despite this, the Trail Blazers had a 13-game winning streak that began in early December, resulting in a 13–2 record, an NBA best, for the month of December. McMillan won NBA Coach of the Month honors, and Roy garnered NBA Western Conference Player of the Week honors in back-to-back weeks (the first Trail Blazer to accomplish the feat since Clyde Drexler in the 1990–91 season). Roy was also named as a reserve for the 2008 NBA All-Star Game, the first All-Star for the Blazers since Rasheed Wallace in 2001. The Blazers finished the season 41–41, their best record since the 2003–04 season.

The 2008–09 season brought the excitement and uproar fans had been waiting for. After much waiting, Greg Oden debuted with the Blazers, playing in 61 games. Portland also added some international flavor to the team with the arrival of Spanish swingman Rudy Fernández, a member of the Spain national basketball team. French-native Nicolas Batum emerged as a skilled defensive forward who was inserted into the starting lineup as a rookie. Roy appeared in his second straight All-Star Game, and Fernández competed in the Sprite Slam Dunk Contest during NBA All-Star Weekend. Roy had a career-high 52 points against the Phoenix Suns and game-winning shots against the Houston Rockets and New York Knicks. The Blazers clinched a playoff berth for the first time since 2003 and achieved a 54–28 record, their first winning record since the 2002–03 season. As the fourth seed and holding home-court advantage, the Trail Blazers played the fifth-seeded Houston Rockets in the 2009 Playoffs, losing the playoff series 4 games to 2. Many credited Portland's loss in the first round to the team's young age and inexperience. However, the 2008–09 season was most notable for the inspiring team chemistry on and off the court, for the potential for a young, energetic group in the upcoming seasons, and for bringing respect back to the franchise – attributes that fans had been missing for over a decade.

In the 2009 off-season, the Trail Blazers traded the No. 24 pick to Dallas for the No. 22 pick and selected Víctor Claver. They also selected Villanova forward Dante Cunningham with the No. 33 pick, Jon Brockman and guard Patrick Mills. Brockman was traded to the Kings in exchange for No. 31 pick Jeff Pendergraph. Free agent Channing Frye signed with the Phoenix Suns and Sergio Rodríguez was traded to the Kings. The Blazers attempted to sign free agent small forward Hedo Türkoğlu, who led the Orlando Magic to the 2009 NBA Finals, but after a verbal agreement he decided to sign with the Toronto Raptors. The Blazers then attempted to sign restricted free agent Paul Millsap; however, their offer was matched by the Utah Jazz. On July 24, 2009, the Trail Blazers signed point guard Andre Miller.

However, the 2009–10 season was a painful one. Despite toting a winning record, injuries had hobbled the team. Reserves Nicolas Batum and Rudy Fernández started the season on the inactive list and forward Travis Outlaw soon followed after a serious foot injury early in the season. Centers Greg Oden and Joel Przybilla suffered season-ending knee injuries in December, while Brandon Roy and LaMarcus Aldridge played through shoulder, hamstring, ankle and knee injuries respectively. Head Coach Nate McMillan was likewise not spared, suffering a ruptured Achilles tendon during practice and having his foot put in a walking boot. Because of the void at the center position, Blazers general manager Kevin Pritchard worked out a deal to acquire Marcus Camby from the Los Angeles Clippers in exchange for Steve Blake and Travis Outlaw. Although wins did not come as easily as the season before, the Blazers rallied to finish at 50–32, and placed 6th in the West. Brandon Roy underwent surgery after suffering a torn meniscus in his right knee, but returned for Game 4 of the first-round series against the Phoenix Suns. However, the accumulation of injuries was too much to bear, and the short-handed Trail Blazers lost the series 4–2 to the Suns.

During the 2010 off-season, the Blazers' front office experienced significant personnel changes beginning in July with the announcement of new general manager Rich Cho, succeeding former general manager Kevin Pritchard, who was relieved of his duties after the 2010 NBA draft. Cho became the first general manager of Asian descent in NBA history.

On August 12, the Trail Blazers signed two new assistant general managers, Bill Branch and Steve Rosenberry. Branch and Rosenberry replaced former assistant general manager Tom Penn, who was released by Portland in March. The organization also made changes to Nate McMillan's coaching staff by hiring Bernie Bickerstaff, Bob Ociepka and Buck Williams with Bickerstaff assuming the lead Assistant Coach position due to the departure of Monty Williams.

The Blazers acquired rookies Armon Johnson, Luke Babbitt, and Elliot Williams from the 2010 NBA draft and off-season trades. On July 21, Wesley Matthews signed a five-year deal with the Blazers after his former team, the Utah Jazz, declined to match their offer.

In October, former Blazer Maurice Lucas died due to cancer.  The 2010–11 Blazers team honored him by wearing No. 20 patches on their jerseys for the season.

Similar to the previous season, Portland was overcome with injuries from the start of the 2010–11 season. Jeff Pendergraph and rookie guard Elliot Williams both suffered knee injuries that sidelined them for the season; Portland later waived Pendergraph. In November, they announced that Oden would have microfracture surgery on his left knee, ending his 2010–2011 season. This injury marked Oden's third NBA season cut short due to a knee injury. Three-time All-Star Brandon Roy underwent double-arthroscopic surgery on January 17, 2011, to repair both knees after dealing with constant struggles, leaving his future up in the air. Just days after, Marcus Camby also underwent arthroscopic knee surgery to repair his left knee.

Despite struggles with injury, Portland performed at a playoff level throughout the season. LaMarcus Aldridge emerged as the focal point of the team and posted career-high numbers, as well as Western Conference Player of the Week and Month honors. Wesley Matthews also emerged in the absence of Brandon Roy, proving his worth as the Blazers' key off-season addition. Believing the team could make a significant run in the playoffs, Cho executed his first major trade on February 24, 2011, just seven minutes before the deadline. The Trail Blazers sent forward Dante Cunningham, center Joel Przybilla and center Sean Marks to the Charlotte Bobcats in return for former All-Star and All-Defensive forward Gerald Wallace.
The emergence of Aldridge and the play of Matthews kept the Blazers competitive, sealing another playoff berth by winning 48 games. However, like in their last two postseasons, the Blazers were eliminated in six games of the first round, this time against the eventual champions, the Dallas Mavericks.

During the 2011 off-season, the Blazers released Cho, supposedly due to communication and "chemistry issues" with owner Paul Allen. Director of Scouting Chad Buchanan took over as acting interim General Manager. The dismissal of Cho was criticized by Sports Illustrated as "illogical", although they noted that Allen had done a lot of questionable moves during his tenure as team owner.

On June 23, 2011, in the NBA Draft, the Trail Blazers drafted guards Nolan Smith from Duke University with the 21st selection and Jon Diebler from Ohio State University with the 51st selection. On the same day, the Blazers front office had made a three-team trade with the Denver Nuggets and Dallas Mavericks. The trade sent Blazers guards Andre Miller to Denver and Rudy Fernández to Dallas along with international player Petteri Koponen, who had yet to make an appearance for Portland; Denver then sent guard Raymond Felton to Portland and Denver also received rookie forward Jordan Hamilton from Dallas as well as a future second-round pick from Portland.

Due to the 2011 NBA lockout, team transactions were on hold until early December and a shortened 66-game schedule was created. On December 9, 2011, pre-season training camp began along with the free agency market. That morning it was made public that Portland's three-time All-Star guard Brandon Roy would retire due to chronic knee problems. Additionally, center Greg Oden was diagnosed with yet another setback involving his ongoing knee issues. Forward LaMarcus Aldridge, who was diagnosed with Wolff-Parkinson-White Syndrome in 2007, underwent a similar procedure to correct the heart problem after diagnosis earlier that day. Blazers interim GM Chad Buchanan signed three free agents the week before Portland's first exhibition game. On December 11, Portland agreed to terms with veteran forward-center Kurt Thomas to help fill the frontcourt void in the roster. In need of a scoring wingman after the departure of Roy and Fernandez, the Blazers signed 2010 NBA Sixth Man of the Year Winner Jamal Crawford on December 15 by using the new NBA Amnesty Clause on Roy. Later that day, the Blazers signed a third free agent, forward Craig Smith. After getting off to a 7–2 start and recognition as a growing power in the Western Conference, the team quickly began to collapse. Starting point guard Raymond Felton, among others, struggled with McMillan's new approach to a running-style offense. The team gained some notability as Aldridge was named to his first All-Star Game. Despite Aldridge's solid performance, the rest of the team became more inconsistent.

On March 15, 2012, The Portland Trail Blazers made several moves, including two trades before the 3 pm EST deadline. Center Marcus Camby was sent to the Houston Rockets in exchange for center Hasheem Thabeet and point guard Jonny Flynn. Portland also received Houston's second-round draft pick in the 2012 NBA Draft. Portland then traded forward Gerald Wallace to the New Jersey Nets for center Mehmet Okur, forward Shawne Williams, and New Jersey's first-round, top-3-protected pick in the 2012 NBA draft. All four players acquired in the trades held expiring contracts, meaning they would be free agents at the end of the season. Oden was released from the roster after playing a total of 82 games in five NBA seasons, being cut along with Chris Johnson in order to make room for the incoming traded players. Finally, head coach Nate McMillan was also fired, leaving the franchise with the third-most coaching wins, behind Jack Ramsay and Rick Adelman. Portland named Kaleb Canales as the interim head coach for the rest of the 2011–2012 NBA season. A few days later, Portland claimed forward J. J. Hickson off waivers from the Sacramento Kings. After shaking up the roster and limping to the end of the regular season with a 28–38 record and finishing out of playoff contention for the first time in three years, the team entered the offseason on the search for a general manager and new head coach.

At the 2012 NBA Draft Lottery on May 30, the Blazers secured the number 6 pick of the draft via the Brooklyn Nets from the Gerald Wallace trade, and also ended up with the number 11 pick due to their own record.

2012–present: Damian Lillard era

On June 4, 2012, The Portland Trail Blazers announced the hiring of new general manager Neil Olshey, making it just over a year since the Blazers had a non-interim general manager.

On June 28, 2012, the Blazers selected Weber State guard Damian Lillard and University of Illinois center Meyers Leonard with the 6th and 11th picks overall, respectively. They also selected University of Memphis guard Will Barton with the 40th pick overall, and traded the rights of the 41st overall pick, University of Kansas guard Tyshawn Taylor, to the Brooklyn Nets for cash considerations.

On July 11, 2012, the Portland Trail Blazers announced the signing of their 22nd pick from the 2009 draft, Víctor Claver. On July 12, 2012, the Blazers announced the re-signing of forward J. J. Hickson. On July 13, 2012, the Blazers announced the signing of their 30th pick from the 2006 draft, Joel Freeland.  In free agency, the Blazers re-signed Nicolas Batum on July 18. They also signed veteran point guard Ronnie Price. On July 20, 2012, the Blazers received Sasha Pavlovic and draft picks in a three-team trade.

Rookie Lillard set the NBA record for three-point field goals made by a rookie, and averaged 19 points and 6.5 assists. The Trail Blazers finished 11th in the West, going 33–49, going 8–24 to end the season after starting 25-25. This end included losing the last 13 games of the season, setting a record for longest losing streak in team history.

Rivalries

The "I-5 Rivalry"
The Seattle SuperSonics were the traditional rivals of the Blazers. Due to the proximity of the teams, the rivalry had been dubbed the "I-5 Rivalry" in reference to the Interstate 5 freeway that connects the two cities. Many fans made the trip up to Seattle for the games, with Seattle fans making the trek down to Portland for their games. The rivalry was fairly equal in accomplishments, with both teams winning one championship each. The all-time record of this rivalry ended at 98–94 in favor of the SuperSonics.

Trail Blazers vs. The Oregonian
Relations between the team and The Oregonian have often been tense; the paper is editorially independent of the team and is often critical. During the Steve Patterson era, relations between the two institutions became increasingly hostile; several NBA executives told ESPN's Chris Sheridan that the situation was the "most dysfunctional media-team relationship" that they could recall.  Much of the hostility started after an incident in which forward Darius Miles called coach Maurice Cheeks an ethnic slur in 2005, and was suspended for two games, a number many fans considered to be insufficient.  A proposed agreement was negotiated behind the scenes between the team and the player to refund much of his fine provided he drop appeals to the players' union.  Details of this agreement were leaked to Oregonian columnist John Canzano, who reported the existence of the agreement in his column, criticizing the team for its apparent duplicity.  The Trail Blazers denied that such an agreement was in the works, at which point the paper published the leaked memo online; the team would later claim that the memo came from Miles' agent.

The relationship between the paper and the team continued to deteriorate over the following year.  In May 2006, the team instituted a new policy requiring that it be permitted to record all interviews of team players and staff, including the right to post transcripts or recordings on the team website.  Prior to the 2006 NBA draft, a group of reporters was invited to a pre-draft workout the team was holding.  During a portion of the workout which was closed to the media, an Oregonian reporter looked through a curtain separating the press from the workout, and observed Gonzaga University star Adam Morrison, then considered a likely draft prospect for the team, playing poorly; he wrote about this on his blog.  The team was outraged, and published a scathing criticism of Jason Quick on its website, closing subsequent practices to the press altogether. John Canzano responded with outrage on this blog, called the team "paranoid", and referred to Art Sasse, the Blazers' VP of communications, as a "henchman" and "Steve Patterson's personal bootlicker".  Henry Abbott of ESPN blog TrueHoop commented that the team had gone "off the deep end", noting that "[t]here has never been a team of any kind, in the history of eternity, that won over the public while declaring war on the reporters covering the team."

In November 2006, the Oregonian commissioned an outside editor, Craig Lancaster of the San Jose Mercury-News, to investigate the deteriorating relationship between the paper and the team's management, a move the rival Willamette Week called "unusual".  In the report, Lancaster criticized both sides somewhat, but did not make any revelations which were unexpected. Canzano referred to the piece as "ill conceived" and a "waste of space"; the team found the article unsatisfying as well.

Fan support and "Blazermania"

The relationship between the team and its fans, commonly known as "Blazermania", has been well-chronicled.  The Trail Blazers have long been one of the NBA's top draws, with the exception of two periods in the team's history.  The team drew poorly during its first four seasons of existence, failing to average more than 10,000 spectators per game.  Attendance increased in 1974, when the team drafted Bill Walton.

The phenomenon known as Blazermania started during the 1976–1977 season, when the team posted its first winning record, made its first playoff appearance, and captured its only NBA title, defeating the heavily favored Philadelphia 76ers in the NBA Finals; the team has been wildly popular in Portland since that time.  That season, the team started their sellout streak which continued until the team moved into the Rose Garden in 1995.  The team continued to average over 19,000 spectators per game until the 2003–04 season.

Attendance declined significantly in the 2003–04 season, as the team continued to suffer image problems due to the "Jail Blazer" reputation it had gained, and was no longer competitive on the court. Writing for the New York Times, NBA columnist Chris Broussard remarked that Blazermania was "dead". A series of management miscues, including the Rose Garden arena bankruptcy, took a further toll on attendance, and the team posted two straight seasons with less than thirty wins, including the worst campaign of the 2005–06 NBA season with 21 wins and 61 losses.  After drafting eventual Rookie of the Year Brandon Roy in 2006, attendance climbed a bit in the 2006–07 season, as the team was more competitive and posted a 32–50 record.  Many expected that the selection of Greg Oden in the 2007 NBA draft would cause attendance to increase. Prior to his season-ending knee surgery, season ticket sales were markedly up.  Even with Oden on crutches on the sideline, the team's 2007–08 home opener, a 93–90 victory over the New Orleans Hornets, was a sellout. The season culminated in 32 sold-out home games, of which the final 27 home games were consecutive sell-outs.

List of coaches
The complete list of Trail Blazers' head coaches, and their tenures, is as follows:
 Rolland Todd, 1970–1972
 Stu Inman, 1972 (interim)
 Jack McCloskey, 1972–1974
 Lenny Wilkens, 1974–1976
 Dr. Jack Ramsay, 1976–1986
 Mike Schuler, 1986–1989
 Rick Adelman, 1989 (interim), 1989–1994
 P. J. Carlesimo, 1994–1997
 Mike Dunleavy, 1997–2001
 Maurice Cheeks, 2001–2005
 Kevin Pritchard, 2005 (interim)
 Nate McMillan, 2005–2012
 Kaleb Canales, 2012–2012 (interim)
 Terry Stotts, 2012–2021
 Chauncey Billups, 2021–present

Among Trail Blazers' assistants who have served as head coaches elsewhere in the NBA are Dick Harter, Mike D'Antoni, Bill Musselman and Rick Carlisle. Two former UNLV men's basketball coaches, Bill Bayno and Tim Grgurich, have served on the Blazers' coaching staff.

Records vs. opponents
Updated through the end of the 2018–19 season.

References

External links
Portland Trail Blazers Official Site

Portland Trail Blazers
Portland